Suncheon Castle, also known as Suncheon Waeseong (Hangul: 순천왜성, Japanese: 順天倭城), in Korean, Juntenjō (順天城) in Japanese, is the only remaining Japanese castle in Jeollanam-do, and the battlefield of Yi Sun-sin who tempted Konishi Yukinaga from here to Noryang Point known as Battle of Noryang Point.

Characteristics 
Yagura (Guard Tower) : 3 at least.
Moats, Gates and other structures.
Date of Construction : December 2, 1597 (established).
Founder : Ukita Hideie, Tōdō Takatora.
Status : The 171st Jeollanamdo monument.
Area : 188,428  m2.
Location : Sinseong-ri, Haeryong-myeon, Suncheon, Jeollanam-do.

History 
The castle was built by the Japanese generals Ukita Hideie and Tōdō Takatora as an outpost during the second invasion of Korea in 1597. The castle was constructed using mud and stone with a footprint of 120,600  m2 for the outside castle (Hangul : 외성) 2502m for the inside castle (Hangul : 내성) 1342m. The site consists of 3 outside mud castles (Hangul:외곽성 or 토석성), 3 main stone castles (Hangul: 본성 석성) and 12 castle gates. It is the only castle preserved among 26 Japanese castles in the southern region.

The Japanese general Konishi Yukinaga stayed in this castle with 14,000 troops to fight on two occasions against Joseon and Ming (China) allied forces.

See also 
Siege of Suncheon
Suncheon
Japanese castles in Korea
Ulsan Japanese Castle

External links 

Map of Suncheon Japanese Castle
Suncheon Waeseong (Castle built by Japanese), Chungmu Temple
 https://web.archive.org/web/20050528111615/http://www.ngokim.pe.kr/imjin/~LWF0045.bmp
 https://web.archive.org/web/20070927075151/http://www.ngokim.pe.kr/imjin/imjin.htm

Japanese-style castles in Korea
Japanese invasions of Korea (1592–1598)
Castles in South Korea